Kesklinn (Estonian for "City centre") is a neighbourhood of Tartu, Estonia.

References

Tartu